Matej Náther (born 23 July 1985 in Martin) is a Slovak football midfielder who currently plays for ŠK LR Crystal Lednické Rovne.

Career
After his professional career he established his football academy called Football Academy Matej Náther (FAMN). It is situated in Dolné Kočkovce, near Púchov.

Club
In February 2011, he joined Podbeskidzie Bielsko-Biała on a three-year contract which will apply from 1 July 2011.

References

External links
 
 
 Profile at fcvion.sk 
 

1985 births
Living people
Slovak footballers
Association football midfielders
MŠK Púchov players
AS Trenčín players
FC ViOn Zlaté Moravce players
Slovak Super Liga players
Podbeskidzie Bielsko-Biała players
Zawisza Bydgoszcz players
Sandecja Nowy Sącz players
FK Iskra Borčice players
Ekstraklasa players
Sportspeople from Martin, Slovakia
Slovak expatriate footballers
Expatriate footballers in Poland
Slovak expatriate sportspeople in Poland